Mehdi Hashemnejad  (born 	October 27, 2001) is an Iranian football midfielder who currently plays for Tractor in the Persian Gulf Pro League.

Club career

Naft Masjed Soleyman
He made his debut for Naft Masjed Soleyman in the 19th fixtures of 2021–22 Persian Gulf Pro League against Foolad.

References

Living people
2001 births
Association football midfielders
Iranian footballers
Naft Masjed Soleyman F.C. players
People from Bandar-e Anzali
Persian Gulf Pro League players
Sportspeople from Gilan province
Persepolis F.C. players
Iran international footballers